Martina Fitzgerald is a Canadian radio journalist, who is the current anchor of CBC Radio One's news program The World This Weekend.

She was born in Brockville, and grew up in Kingston, Ontario.

References

External links
 Martina Fitzgerald

Living people
Canadian radio news anchors
Canadian women radio journalists
Year of birth missing (living people)
CBC Radio hosts
Canadian women television journalists
People from Brockville
Canadian women radio hosts